Mikhail Peunov (born 1 January 1948) is a Soviet archer. He competed in the men's individual event at the 1972 Summer Olympics.

References

1948 births
Living people
Soviet male archers
Olympic archers of the Soviet Union
Archers at the 1972 Summer Olympics
Place of birth missing (living people)